Little Shop of Horrors may refer to:
 The Little Shop of Horrors, a 1960 film directed by Roger Corman
 Little Shop of Horrors (musical), a 1982 musical based on the 1960 film
 Little Shop of Horrors (film), a 1986 film adaptation of the musical, directed by Frank Oz

See also 
 Little Shop, a 1991 animated TV series spin-off from the original 1960 film.